The Board of Intermediate and Secondary Education, Sargodha (BISE Sargodha) is a government board for intermediate (higher secondary) and secondary education examination. It is located in Sargodha, Punjab. Pakistan

History 
BISE Sargodha was established in 1968 under the West Pakistan Board of Intermediate and secondary (Sargodha and Multan). Building was shifted to its present location in 1975.

Jurisdiction 

The jurisdiction of Sargodha Board includes Sargodha Division which includes following districts:
 Sargodha District
 Khushab District
 Mianwali District
 Bhakkar District

Examinations 
The board conducts examinations at SSC & HSSC level. The SSC ANNUAL EXAMINATION 2020 which commenced on 22 February 2020 was postponed from 14 March 2020 to onwards and on 7 May 2020 it was announced by Federal Minister of Education, Mr. Shafqat Mehmood that this examination has been cancelled for Academic Year 2019-20. The HSSC ANNUAL EXAMINATION 2020 which was to commence from 28 April 2020 was also postponed, and it was also cancelled on 7 May 2020 due to the coronavirus pandemic in Pakistan.

See also 
 List of educational boards in Pakistan
 Board of Intermediate Education, Karachi
 Board of Secondary Education, Karachi
 Board of Intermediate and Secondary Education, Lahore
 Board of Intermediate and Secondary Education, Faisalabad
 Board of Intermediate and Secondary Education, Hyderabad
 Board of Intermediate and Secondary Education, Rawalpindi
 Board of Intermediate and Secondary Education, Multan
 Board of Intermediate and Secondary Education, Gujranwala
 Board of Intermediate and Secondary Education, Sahiwal
 Board of Intermediate and Secondary Education, Dera Ghazi Khan
 Board of Intermediate and Secondary Education, Bahawalpur

References

External links
 BISE Sargodha official website

Sargodha